The Joint Committee on Printing is a joint committee of the United States Congress devoted to overseeing the functions of the Government Publishing Office and general printing procedures of the federal government of the United States. The current joint committee was created by the Legislative Reorganization Act of 1946 and combined the functions of the United States House Committee on Printing and the United States Senate Committee on Printing.

The Committee traces its lineage back to a similar one created by an act of August 3, 1846 (§2) consisting of three members each from the two houses. By virtue of this it is the oldest joint committee of the Congress, although not continuously organized as such.

Leaders of the committee typically serve as the tellers of juring the joint session of Congress when the electoral voters are counted in accordance with the Electoral Count Act.

Composition 
There are five members of each house on the committee, which has no subcommittees. The committee consists of the chairman and four members of the United States Senate Committee on Rules and Administration and the United States House Committee on House Administration in the House of Representatives. Every two years the chairmanship and vice-chairmanship rotate between the U.S. House of Representatives and the U.S. Senate.

Members, 117th Congress

Members, 116th Congress

Members, 115th Congress

Members, 114th Congress

Members, 113th Congress

See also
 List of current United States House of Representatives committees 
 List of current United States Senate committees

References

External links
Official website of the committee
U.S. Government Publishing Office website 
JCP publications page on GPO website
U.S. Congress Joint Committee on Printing Organization Authority Record

Printing
1946 establishments in Washington, D.C.